Wrightia annamensis is a small tree species in the family Apocynaceae.  Its distribution includes: southern China, Cambodia and Viet Nam: where it may be called: lòng mức trung bộ.

At the time of writing (July 2018) there is a database conflict, with some authorities placing this species as a heterotypic synonym of Wrightia pubescens subsp. lanitii (Blanco).

References

External links

annamensis
Flora of Indo-China
Trees of Vietnam
Plants described in 1913